Ambia phobos is a moth in the family Crambidae. It was described by Viette in 1989. It is found in Madagascar.

References

Moths described in 1989
Musotiminae
Moths of Madagascar